WURD (900 AM) is a radio station in Philadelphia, Pennsylvania. It broadcasts a talk format primarily targeted to African Americans, and is currently under the ownership of LEVAS Communications, LP. It is also heard via FM repeater W241CH on 96.1 MHz.

History
The station began operations around 1958 as WFLN, serving as a daytime-only AM simulcast of classical station WFLN-FM. 

In the early 1980s, the station was sold to veteran Philadelphia broadcaster Frank Ford, who changed the callsign to WDVT, and changed the format to talk. Weekday talk show hosts on WDVT included Peter Tilden, Philadelphia Magazine writer Carol Saline, former Philadelphia Bulletin columnist D.I. Strunk and Ford himself. Weekend specialty shows on the station covered subjects ranging from pro wrestling to gay issues. 

WDVT made little impact in the ratings, and after a few years, Ford took the station off the air and returned its license to the owners of WFLN, who sold it to Willis Broadcasting, a Virginia-based religious broadcaster who changed the call letters to WURD. 

In 1996, Spanish broadcaster Alfredo Alonso bought the station for $1.5 million and turned it into a Spanish-language operation as WEMG, "Mega 900." The station became the first property purchased by Alonso, who founded Mega Broadcasting that same year. Eventually, Mega moved the WEMG call sign to 1310 kHz, and sold 900 AM for $8.5 million in 2002. 

The new owner, Walter P. Lomax Jr., reinstituted the WURD call sign. After a period of apparent indecision during which the station aired various types of music and CNN Headline News, management settled on the current talk format.

External links
FCC History Cards for WURD

News and talk radio stations in the United States
URD
Radio stations established in 1958
1958 establishments in Pennsylvania